Yantai, formerly known as Chefoo, is a coastal prefecture-level city on the Shandong Peninsula in northeastern Shandong province of People's Republic of China.  Lying on the southern coast of the Bohai Strait, Yantai borders Qingdao on the southwest and Weihai on the east, with sea access to both the Bohai Sea (via the Laizhou Bay and the Bohai Strait) and the Yellow Sea (from both north and south sides of the Shandong Peninsula).  It is the largest fishing seaport in Shandong.  Its population was 6,968,202 during the 2010 census, of whom 2,227,733 lived in the built-up area made up of the 4 urban districts of Zhifu, Muping, Fushan and Laishan.

Names 
The towers were used to light signal fires and send smoke signals, called langyan from their supposed use of wolf dung for fuel. At the time, the area was troubled by the Japanese pirates (Wokou), initially raiders from the warring states in Japan but later principally disaffected Chinese. It was also formerly romanized as Yen-tai.

The major district of Yantai is Zhifu, which used to be the largest independent city in the area. It was variously romanized as Chefoo, Che-foo, Chi-fu, and Chih-fou. Although this name was used for the city by foreigners prior to the Communist victory in the Chinese Civil War, the locals referred to the settlement as Yantai throughout.

History 

During the Xia and Shang dynasties, the region was inhabited by indigenous people vaguely known to the Chinese as the "Eastern Barbarians" (Dongyi). Under the Zhou, they were colonized and sinicized as the state of Lai. Lai was annexed by Qi in  Under the First Emperor (Shi Huangdi), the area was administered as the Qi Commandery. Under the Han, this was renamed as the Donglai Commandery. Following the Three Kingdoms Period, the area was organized by the Jin as the Donglai Kingdom or Principality, later returning to prefecture status as a jùn and then zhōu. Under the Tang and during the Five Dynasties and Ten Kingdoms Period, it was known as Deng Prefecture and organized with the Henan Circuit. It was then organized as the Laizhou and then, under the Qing, Dengzhou Prefecture.

Up to the 19th century, however, the Zhifu area consisted of nothing but small unwalled fishing villages of little importance. Under the Ming, these were first troubled by the "Dwarf Pirates" and then by the overreacting "Sea Ban", which required coastal Chinese to give up trading and most fishing and relocate inland upon pain of death.

Following the Second Opium War, the Qing Empire was obliged to open more treaty ports by the unequal 1858 Treaty of Tianjin, including Tengchow (now Penglai). The mooring was at considerable distance from shore, necessitating more time and expense in loading and unloading, but the harbor was deep and expansive and business grew rapidly. The harbor opened in May 1861, with its status as an international port affirmed on 22 August. The official decree was accompanied by the construction of the Donghai Customs House. It quickly became the residence of a circuit intendant ("taotai"), customs house, and a considerable foreign settlement located between the old native town and the harbor. Britain and sixteen other nations established consulates in the town. The town was initially expanded with well-laid streets and well-built stone houses, even for the poorer classes, a Catholic and a Protestant church were erected, and a large hotel did business with foreigners who employed the town as a summer resort.

The principal traders were the British and Americans, followed by the Germans and Thais. In the 1870s, the principal imports were woolen and cotton goods, iron, and opium and the principal exports were tofu, soybean oil, peas, coarse vermicelli, vegetables, and dried fruit from Zhifu itself, raw silk and straw braid from Laizhou, and walnuts from Qingzhou. The town also traded Chinese liquors and sundries for the edible seaweed grown in the shallows of the Russian settlements around Port Arthur (now Dalian's Lüshunkou District). In 1875, the murder of the British diplomat Augustus Margary in Tengchong, Yunnan, led to a diplomatic crisis that was resolved in Zhifu by Thomas Wade and Li Hongzhang the next year. The resultant Chefoo Convention gave British subjects extraterritoriality throughout China and exempted the foreign merchants' enclaves from the likin tax on internal commerce. Its healthy situation and good anchorage made it a favorite coaling station for foreign fleets, giving it some importance in the conflicts over Korea, Port Arthur, and Weihaiwei.

Award-winning Chefoo bobbin lace was produced following the introduction of the craft by British missionaries, reportedly becoming a popular export. Chefoo lace was exhibited at the 1904 St. Louis World's Fair. 

Yantai received German economic activities and investments for about 20 years. In the run-up to the First World War, its trade continued to grow but was limited by the poor roads of the area's hinterland and the necessity of using pack animals for portage. The trade items remained largely the same as before. After the Germans were defeated by Allied forces in World War I, Qingdao and Yantai were occupied by the Japanese, who turned Yantai into a summer station for their Asian fleet. They also set up a trading establishment in the town. The different foreign influences that shaped this city are explored at the Yantai Museum, which used to be a guild hall. However, the city's colourful history has not left a distinctive architectural mark, there has never been a foreign concession, and though there are a few grand 19th-century European buildings, most of the town is of much more recent origin. After 1949, the town's name was changed from Chefoo to Yantai, and it was opened to the world as an ice-free trade port in 1984.

On 12 November 1911, the eastern division of Tongmeng Hui declared itself a part of the revolutionary movement. The next day, it established the Shandong Military Government and, the day after that, renamed itself the Yantai Division of the Shandong Military Government. In 1914, Jiaodong Circuit was established with Yantai as the capital. Jiaodong Circuit was renamed Donghai Circuit in 1925. On 19 January 1938, Yantai participated as part of an anti-Japanese revolutionary committee.

After the creation of the People's Republic of China, Yantai was officially awarded city status with the outlying towns of Laiyang and Wendeng tacked on as "Special Regions" in 1950. Wendeng was merged into Laiyang six years later, and this larger Laiyang Special Region was combined with Yantai City to become Yantai Prefecture. Yantai is of strategic importance to China's defense, as it and Dalian, directly across the Bohai Sea from it, are primary coastal guard points for Beijing. In November 1983, the prefecture became a prefecture-level city.

Geography

Yantai is located along the north coast of the Shandong Peninsula, south of the junction of Bohai Sea and Yellow Sea and parallel to the southern coast of Liaoning. The topographical breakdown consists of:
 36.62% mountainous
 39.7% hilly
 50.23% plain
 2.90% basin
About  is urbanized. Only Qixia City is located entirely inland. All other county-level entities are coastal, with Changdao consisting entirely of islands.

 Wulong River
 Dagu River
 Dagujia River
 Wang River
 Jie River
 Huangshui River
 Xin'an River
The core of the old town of Zhifu was located above the mouth of the Yi (Yí Hé).

Climate
Yantai has a monsoon-influenced climate which under the Köppen climate classification, Yantai falls within either a hot-summer humid continental climate (Dwa) if the  isotherm is used or a humid subtropical climate (Cwa) if the  isotherm is used. Summers are hot, humid, and rainy while winters are cold and dry.

Administration
The prefecture-level city of Yantai administers 12 county-level divisions, including 5 districts, 6 county-level cities, and one development zone.

 Zhifu District （芝罘区）
 Fushan District （福山区）
 Muping District （牟平区）
 Laishan District （莱山区）
 Penglai District（蓬莱区）
 Laiyang City （莱阳市）
 Laizhou City （莱州市）
 Zhaoyuan City （招远市）
 Qixia City （栖霞市）
 Haiyang City （海阳市）
 Longkou City （龙口市）
 Yantai Economic and Technological Development Zone 
 Yantai Hi-tech Industrial Development Zone

These are further divided into 148 township-level divisions, including 94 towns, six townships, and 48 subdistricts.

There is a beautiful and magical place in Yantai. It's called CHANGDAO. CHANGDAO is the only island county in Shandong Province, consisting of 32 islands. The land area of the island is 56.8 square kilometers, the sea area is 3541 square kilometers and the coastline is 187.8 kilometers. CHANGDAO is located between Jiaodong Peninsula and Liaodong Peninsula, where the Yellow Sea and the Bohai Sea meet and is located in the connecting belt of the Bohai Sea economic circle.

Economy

Yantai is currently the second largest industrial city in Shandong, next to Qingdao. However, the region's largest industry is agriculture. It is famous throughout China for a particular variety of apple and Laiyang pear, and is home to the country's largest and oldest grape winery, Changyu.

The county-level city of Longkou is well known throughout China for its production of cellophane noodles.

Power
Yantai derives most of its energy from a large coal power plant using bituminous coal, and fitted with coal gasification technology to minimize pollution. The plant is located close to Yantai port. An attempt to switch northern China from coal to natural gas resulted in shortages, and in 2017 the Chinese government implemented a new plan to convert half of northern China to clean energy for winter heating. Haiyang, a city under Yantai's prefecture, is anticipated to meet its total winter heating needs with nuclear power by 2021.

Industrial zones

Yantai Economic and Technological Development Area 
Yantai Economic and Technological Development Area is one of the earliest approved state-level economic development zones in China. It lies on the tip of the Shandong Peninsula facing the Yellow Sea. It adjoins downtown Yantai, merely 6 kilometers away from Yantai Port and 6 kilometers away from Yantai Railway Station (not to be confused with Yantai South Railway Station).

Yantai Export Processing Zone 
Yantai Export Processing Zone (YTEPZ) is one of the first 15 export processing zones approved by the State Council. After developing for several years, YTEPZ is completely constructed. Up to now, owing to an excellent investment environment, YTEPZ has attracted investors from foreign countries and regions such as Japan, Korea, Singapore, Hong Kong, Taiwan, Sweden, the United States, Canada, etc., as well as domestic investors, to operate in the zone.

Education

The following is a list of prominent Yantai higher education institutions.
 Yantai University
 Ludong University
 Shandong Institute of Business and Technology

China Agricultural University and
Binzhou Medical College house campuses in Yantai.

It houses a Korean international school, Korean School in Yantai.

Chefoo School previously educated foreign children.

Transport
Yantai Penglai International Airport provides scheduled flights to major airports in China as well as Seoul, Osaka, and Hong Kong. The Lancun–Yantai railway ends at Yantai.
The Qinggrong Intercity Railway, the first intercity high-speed railway in Shandong Province, has been put into operation, cutting the travel time of the fastest train from Qingdao to Yantai from about 4 hours and 30 minutes to about 1 hour and 15 minutes.

Tourism

Penglai City's Dan Cliffs is said to be the departure point of the Eight Immortals on their trip to the Conference of the Magical Peach.  It is important to note that Penglai is around 80 km from the city centre of Yantai.

Twin towns – sister cities

Notable people 

 Qiu Chuji (1148–1227), leading Quanzhen Taoist priest and founder of Dragon Gate Taoism
 Qi Jiguang (1528–1588), Ming dynasty military general most remembered for defending coastal China against Japanese pirates
 Wang Yirong (1845–1900), Qing dynasty official and historian who was first to recognize the oracle bone script
 Henry Luce (1898–1967), founder of Time Magazine, Sports Illustrated, and owned many magazine publications such as Life Magazine
 Peter Stursberg (1913–2014), Canadian writer and journalist
 Chou Wen-chung (1923–2019), composer
 Liu Zewen (b. 1943), artist
 Zhang Jizhong (b. 1951), film producer, director and television producer
 Lin Qingxia (b. 1954), actress
 Wang Zhengpu (b. 1963), politician
 Dong Jun (b.1963), People's Liberation Army Navy commander
 Huo Jianhua (b. 1979), actor
 Wang Yaping (b. 1980), People's Liberation Army Astronaut Corps astronaut
 Fan Bingbing (b. 1981), actress
 Guanqun Yu (b. 1982), Opera singer
 Zhao Yingzi (b. 1990), actress

See also

 Chefoo School

Notes

References

Citations

Sources 

 .
 .

External links 

 Government website of Yantai  (available in Chinese, English, German, French, Japanese and Korean)
 Old photos of Yantai (Chefoo) 
 1912 historical map of Yantai

 
Cities in Shandong
Prefecture-level divisions of Shandong
Port cities and towns in China